Westwood is an unincorporated community in Henry Township, Henry County, Indiana.

Westwood was founded in 1923.

Geography
Westwood is the home of West Wood Park.

References

Unincorporated communities in Henry County, Indiana
Unincorporated communities in Indiana